Shake! (formerly NGA, The Core and Milkshake FM) was a television programming block shown by United Kingdom broadcaster Channel 5, airing animated and live-action programmes aimed at children and teenagers age 8 to 15 year olds.

History
Before the introduction of the name The Core in 2000, the unbranded 'youth' strand was launched back in 1997, presented by Kate McIntyre in vision. Nick Wilson, Channel 5 programme controller for children's and religious programming, said it was a deliberate decision not to give the strand a name, like Channel 4's T4. He said "Once you get past 13 the last thing you want is to be put into your own zone or slot." The strand had its own on-air look from The Design Clinic, which included six new cartoon characters described as "a cross between South Park and the Mr. Men" that will unexpectedly bounce around on McIntyre during the continuity breaks. Programmes were scheduled between 11am and 12 noon on Saturday, 4.30pm and 6pm on Saturday and 11am to 1pm on Sunday.

The block originally ran between 2000 and 2007 under various names, and was launched as a new umbrella branding for older kids and teen programs on Channel 5 following the earlier demise in 1999 of the Josie D'Arby-hosted weekend afternoon teen series The Mag.

The block launched in 2000 as The Core, broadcasting on Saturday afternoons.  A number of originally commissioned programs were created for the block, such as Harry and Cosh and Atlantis High, a number of imported teens shows were also used.

In Channel 5's major network relaunch of 2002, The Core was renamed to Milkshake! FM in January 2002, taking its name from the established Channel 5 pre-school age slot Milkshake!. This block aired in the mid-morning (circa 9 am-noon) on Saturdays and Sundays, while a number of programs aired during The Core continued to be broadcast during Saturday afternoons. In September 2002, it was re-branded again as two separate blocks, Shake! and Milkshake! Toons. Milkshake! Toons aired in the afternoon (circa noon-5pm).

The block was removed in May 2007 and teen programs aired on Saturday morning not under a block of any sort on Channel 5.

Presenters
Presenters have included:
Kate McIntyre (1997–2002)
Marc Crumpton (2001–2002)
Dave Payne (2005–2007)
Jen Pringle (2009–2010)
Kemi Majeks (2002-2005)

Programming

Former programmes
 The Adventures of Sinbad
 The Adventures of Tintin
 Atlantis High
 Beast Wars: Transformers
 Beyblade
 Beyblade V-Force
 Braceface
 Dan Dare: Pilot of the Future
 Daria
 Deepwater Black
 Don't Blame the Koalas
 Duel Monsters
 Fat Dog Mendoza
 Gadget & the Gadgetinis
 George Shrinks
 Gerald McBoing-Boing
 Hannah Montana
 Harry and Cosh
 Hercules: The Legendary Journeys
 iCarly
 Kaput and Zösky
 Max Steel
 Pepsi Chart
 The Perils of Penelope Pitstop
 Popular
 Singled Out
 Snobs
 Strange Dawn
 The Tribe True Jackson VP USA High Wizards of Waverly Place Xcalibur Xena: Warrior Princess Zentrix2009 revival

In September 2009, it was announced that Channel 5 had entered into a strategic sponsorship with Disney to bring back Shake!. Under the new arrangement, Disney would sponsor the block and also provide some Disney Channel programming for the slot, such as Hannah Montana and Wizards of Waverly Place. Shake! returned with a new presenter, Jen Pringle.

The revived Shake! launched on Sunday 4 October 2009 at 10am with Snobs, Wizards of Waverly Place, Hannah Montana and The Tribe. Snobs and The Tribe were previously screened during the earlier run of Shake!.

In 2010, Shake! was sponsored by Nickelodeon, returning with a revamped set and showing iCarly and True Jackson, VP, among others.

However, Shake! was removed again in 2011 and was replaced with other imports including Power Rangers, Batman: The Brave And The Bold, ThunderCats and SlugTerra. In 2014 they began airing shows from Nicktoons including  SpongeBob SquarePants, Teenage Mutant Ninja Turtles, Rise of the Teenage Mutant Ninja Turtles, The Fairly OddParents and The Loud House''.

References

Channel 5 (British TV channel) original programming